Haplogroup E-M96 is a human Y-chromosome DNA haplogroup. It is one of the two main branches of the older and ancestral haplogroup DE, the other main branch being haplogroup D. The E-M96 clade is divided into two main subclades: the more common E-P147, and the less common E-M75.

Origins

Underhill (2001) proposed that haplogroup E may have arisen in East Africa. Some authors as Chandrasekar (2007), accept the earlier position of Hammer (1997) that Haplogroup E may have originated in West Asia, given that:
 E is a clade of Haplogroup DE, with the other major clade, haplogroup D, being exclusively distributed in Asia.
 DE is a clade within M168 with the other two major clades, C and F, considered to have already a Eurasian origin.

However, several discoveries made since the Hammer articles are thought to make an Asian origin less likely: 
 Underhill and Kivisild (2007) demonstrated that C and F have a common ancestor meaning that DE has only one sibling which is non-African.
 DE* is found in both Asia and Africa, meaning that not only one, but several siblings of D are found in Asia and Africa.
 Karafet (2008), in which Hammer is a co-author, significantly rearranged time estimates leading to "new interpretations on the geographical origin of ancient sub-clades". Amongst other things this article proposed a much older age for haplogroup E-M96 than had been considered previously, giving it a similar age to Haplogroup D, and DE itself, meaning that there is no longer any strong reason to see it as an offshoot of DE which must have happened long after DE came into existence and had entered Asia.

In 2015 Poznik and Underhill have claimed haplogroup E, arose outside Africa, arguing that, "This model of geographical segregation within the CT clade requires just one continental haplogroup exchange (E to Africa), rather than three (D, C, and F out of Africa). The timing of this putative return to Africa, between the emergence of haplogroup E and its differentiation within Africa by 58 kya, is consistent with proposals, based on non–Y chromosome data, of abundant gene flow between Africa and Arabia 50–80 kya."

In 2015 Trobetta et al. suggested an East African origin for haplogroup E, stating: "our phylogeographic analysis, based on thousands of samples worldwide, suggests that the radiation of haplogroup E started about 58 ka, somewhere in sub-Saharan Africa, with a higher posterior probability (0.73) for an eastern African origin."

A Eurasian center of origin and dispersal for haplogroup E has also been hypothesized by Cabrera et al. (2018) based on the similar age of the clade's parent haplogroup DE and the mtDNA haplogroup L3. According to this hypothesis, after an initial Out-of-Africa migration of early anatomically modern humans around 125 kya, E-carrying males are thus proposed to have back-migrated from the paternal haplogroup's place of origin in Eurasia around 70 kya along with females bearing the maternal haplogroup L3, which the study also hypothesizes to have originated in Eurasia. These new Eurasian lineages were then suggested to have largely replaced the old autochthonous male and female African lineages.

A 2019 study by Haber et al. supports an African origin for haplogroup E (based on an analysis of the Y-chromosomal phylogenetic structure, haplogroup divergence times, and the recently discovered haplogroup D0 found in three Nigerians, an additional branch of the DE lineage diverging early from the D branch). The authors support an African origin for DE (parent haplogroup of E) with E and D0 also originating in Africa, along with the migration out of Africa of the three lineages (C, D and FT) that now form the vast majority of non-African Y chromosomes. The early divergence dates found in the study for DE, E, and D0 (all dated from about 71-76 kya), which are determined to predate the migration out-of-Africa of the ancestors of Eurasians (dated to ca. 50-60 kya), are also considered by the authors to support an African origin for those haplogroups.

Ancient DNA

Pre-Pottery Neolithic B remains were found to have carried haplogroup E (1/7; ~14%).

At Nyarindi Rockshelter, in Kenya, there were two individuals, dated to the Later Stone Age (3500 BP); one carried haplogroup L4b2a and another carried haplogroup E (E-M96, E-P162).

At Kindoki, in the Democratic Republic of Congo, there were three individuals, dated to the protohistoric period (230 BP, 150 BP, 230 BP); one carried haplogroups E1b1a1a1d1a2 (E-CTS99, E-CTS99) and L1c3a1b, another carried haplogroup E (E-M96, E-PF1620), and the last carried haplogroups R1b1 (R-P25 1, R-M415) and L0a1b1a1.

Distribution

Most members of haplogroup E-M96 belong to one of its identified subclades, and the E-M96(xE-P147, E-M75) is rare. E1a and E-M75 are found almost exclusively in Africa. By looking at the major subclade frequencies, five broad regions of Africa can be defined: East, Central, North, Southern and West. The division can be distinguished by the prevalence of E-M2 in East, Central, Southern and West Africa, E-M78 in East Africa and E-M81 in North Africa. E-M2 is the most prevalent subclade of E in Africa. It is observed at high frequencies in all African regions from moderate to high. E-M215 (especially its subclades M78 and M81) is found at high frequencies in North East Africa and North Africa and is the only subclade that is found in Europe and Asia at significant frequencies. E-M215 is common among Afro-Asiatic speakers in the Near East and North Africa as well as among some Nilo-Saharan and Niger–Congo speakers in North East Africa and Sudan. E-M215 is far less common in West, Central, and Southern Africa, though it has been observed among some Khoisan speakers and among Niger–Congo speakers in Senegambia, Guinea-Bissau, Burkina Faso, Ghana, Gabon, the Democratic Republic of the Congo, Rwanda, Namibia, and South Africa.

Subclades

E-M96*

Paragroup E-M96* refers to lineages belonging to the E clade but which cannot be classified into any known branch. E(xE1-P147, E2-M75) - that is, E which has tested negative for both P147 and M75 - has been reported in 2 Amharas from Ethiopia, in 2 men from Saudi Arabia, and in a single Bantu-speaking male from South Africa. E(xE1a-M33, E1b1-P2, E2-M75) was reported among several Southern African populations and in an Egyptian man; E(xE1a-M33, E1b1a1-M2, E1b1b-M215, E2-M75) has been observed amongst pygmies and Bantu from Cameroon and Gabon; and E(xE1a-M33, E1b1a1-M2, E1b1b1-M35, E2-M75) has been found in several Lebanese, in Burkina Faso, and a Fulbe man from Niger.

Recently it was discovered that 3 East African men previously classified only as E*-M96 could be assigned to a new branch, E-V44, which is a sister branch to E1-P147; E-P147 and E-V44 share the V3725 mutation, making E2-M75 and E-V3725 the two known primary branches of E. It is not known whether or not some (or all) other E*(xE1, E2) would fall into V44 as well.

E-P147

E-P147 (also known as E1) is by far the most numerous and widely distributed branch of E-M96. It has two primary branches: E-M132 (E1a) and E-P177 (E1b).

Within Haplogroup E-P177, Haplogroup E-P2 (E1b1) – a subclade of E-P177 – is not only the most frequent variant of E-M96, but is also the most common Y-DNA lineage in Africa. It is also the only subclade of E-M96 found in significant numbers in West Asia and Europe.

A prolific primary branch of E-P2, Haplogroup E-M215 (E1b1b) is distributed in high frequencies from East Africa, through North Africa into Western Asia and Southern Europe. It is also found at significant levels among populations native to Southern Africa and throughout Western Europe.

E-M75

E-M75 is present throughout Subequatorial Africa, particularly in the African Great Lakes and Central Africa. The highest concentration of the haplogroup has been found among the Alur (66.67%), Hema (38.89%), Rimaibe (27.03%), Mbuti (25.00%), Daba (22.22%), Eviya (20.83%), Zulu (20.69%), and Kenyan Bantus (17.24%).

Haplogroup E-M75(xM41,M54) has been found in 6% (1/18) of Dama from Namibia, 4% (1/26) of Ganda from Uganda, 3% (1/39) of Mandinka from Gambia/Senegal, and 2% (1/49) of Shona from Zimbabwe.

Family Tree DNA shows numerous persons of Haplogroup E-M75 claiming origins from the Arabian Peninsula (most from Saudi Arabia, but also from Bahrain, Kuwait, Yemen, and United Arab Emirates).  Sampling bias does not allow for meaningful percentages, but the presences of the haplogroup is solidly attested.

Phylogenetics

Phylogenetic history

Prior to 2002, there were in academic literature at least seven naming systems for the Y-Chromosome Phylogenetic tree. This led to considerable confusion. In 2002, the major research groups came together and formed the Y-Chromosome Consortium (YCC). They published a joint paper that created a single new tree that all agreed to use. Later, a group of citizen scientists with an interest in population genetics and genetic genealogy formed a working group to create an amateur tree aiming at being above all timely. The table below brings together all of these works at the point of the landmark 2002 YCC Tree. This allows a researcher reviewing older published literature to quickly move between nomenclatures.

Research publications

The following research teams per their publications were represented in the creation of the YCC tree.

Phylogenetic trees

This phylogenetic tree of haplogroup subclades is based on the Y-Chromosome Consortium (YCC) Tree, the ISOGG Y-DNA Haplogroup Tree, and subsequent published research.

See also

Genetics

Y-DNA E subclades

Y-DNA backbone tree

References

Sources for conversion tables

Further reading

 
 
  Also see Supplementary Data.
 
 . Published online April 2, 2008. See also Supplementary Material.
 . Published online 9 March 2005

External links

Phylogenetic tree and distribution maps of Y-DNA haplogroup E

 Y-DNA Haplogroup E and Its Subclades from ISOGG 2008
 Map of E1b1b1 distribution in Europe
 Distribution of E1b1a/E3a in Africa
 Frequency Distributions of Y-DNA Haplogroup E and its subclades - with Video Tutorial

Projects

 Haplogroup E-V38 Y-DNA Project at FTDNA
 E-M243 Y-DNA Project at FTDNA
 Haplozone::The E-M35 Phylogeny Project (former E3b Project)
 Jewish E-M243 Project at FTDNA

E